A Kharitonov region is a concept in mathematics. It arises in the study of the stability of polynomials.

Let  be a simply-connected set in the complex plane and let  be the polynomial family.

 is said to be a Kharitonov region if

is a subset of  Here,  denotes the set of all vertex polynomials of complex interval polynomials  and  denotes the set of all vertex polynomials of real interval polynomials

See also
Kharitonov's theorem

References

 Y C Soh and Y K Foo (1991), “Kharitonov Regions: It Suffices to Check a Subset of Vertex Polynomials”, IEEE Trans. on Aut. Cont., 36, 1102 – 1105.

Polynomials
Mathematics